Duncan Run is a stream in the U.S. state of Ohio.

Duncan Run was named for a local landowner.

See also
List of rivers of Ohio

References

Rivers of Delaware County, Ohio
Rivers of Franklin County, Ohio
Rivers of Licking County, Ohio
Rivers of Ohio